William M. Miller (June 5, 1927 – March 24, 1997) was an American professional wrestler. He is a one time American Wrestling Association world champion and also wrestled in the National Wrestling Alliance, the World Wrestling Association in Indianapolis and the World Wide Wrestling Federation.

Professional wrestling career 
Prior to his professional wrestling career, Miller was a Nine-letterman at Ohio State University in wrestling, football and track. He was an All-American heavyweight wrestler, a two-time Big Ten heavyweight champion, and Conference MVP his senior year. He was also an All-American shot-put and discus track star. He was voted into the Ohio State University Athletic Hall of Fame in 1997 for both wrestling and track. 

Miller then began to wrestle professionally in Columbus, Ohio under the promoter, Al Haft. He became a Veterinarian while starting his wrestling career, hence, the "Dr." in his name. He wrestled as "Mr. M" in the Minneapolis-St.Paul area and held the AWA title for over seven months while feuding with Verne Gagne. Under his own name he wrestled in the Detroit area with "The Sheik" (Eddie Farhat) through the 60s. He also wrestled in Calgary and Toronto. Later on in the WWA with Dick the Bruiser, in the Indianapolis area near the end of his career.

He was a #1 challenger to Bruno Sammartino for the WWWF World Championship in the mid-1960s, managed by Bobby Davis.

In the early 1960s he teamed with storyline brother Big Ed Miller (Edward B. Albers) in the northeast. His true brother Danny (Daniel Miller), also wrestled and tagged with Bill many times. They held the WWWF United States Tag Team Championship, winning it from Gorilla Monsoon & Cowboy Bill Watts in Washington, DC; losing it to Johnny Valentine & Antonio Pugliese in Madison Square Garden. In the late 1960s he was in a brutal feud against Ray Stevens for the San Francisco version of the United States title. Miller later wrestled in Detroit, St. Louis and Cleveland.

After retiring from the ring in 1976, he returned to his first love of veterinarian medicine and opened a practice in Ohio.

Death
Miller died on March 24, 1997. He suffered a heart attack after working out at the Wyandotte Athletic Club, on Columbus' east side. This was just a few miles west of where Al Haft staged his wrestling bouts in Reynoldsburg, many years before.

Championships and accomplishments

American Wrestling Association
AWA United States Heavyweight Championship (1 time)
AWA World Heavyweight Championship (1 time)
World Heavyweight Championship (Omaha version) (2 times)
George Tragos/Lou Thesz Professional Wrestling Hall of Fame
Class of 2005
Southwest Sports, Inc. / NWA Big Time Wrestling
NWA Brass Knuckles Championship (Texas version) (1 time)
International Pro Wrestling
IWA World Heavyweight Championship (1 time)
Stampede Wrestling
Stampede Wrestling Hall of Fame (Class of 1995)
World Championship Wrestling (Australia)
IWA World Tag Team Championship (1 time) - with Killer Kowalski
World Wrestling Association (Indianapolis)
WWA World Tag Team Championship (1 time) - with Dick the Bruiser
World Wide Wrestling Federation
WWWF United States Tag Team Championship (1 time) - with Dan Miller
Wrestling Observer Newsletter
Hall of Fame (Class of 2009)

References

External links
 

1927 births
1997 deaths
20th-century American male actors
American male professional wrestlers
American male sport wrestlers
AWA World Heavyweight Champions
Masked wrestlers
Professional wrestlers from Ohio
Stampede Wrestling alumni
Ohio State University alumni
20th-century professional wrestlers
WCWA Brass Knuckles Champions
IWA World Tag Team Champions (Australia)
AWA United States Heavyweight Champions